"Glorious"  is a song by British singer and songwriter Ella Henderson. The song was released as a digital download on 13 September 2019 as the lead single from her debut extended play, Glorious.  It's Henderson first release under Atlantic Records after parting ways with Syco Music. The song did not enter the UK Singles Chart, but peaked at number 40 on the Official Singles Sales Chart, which counts only paid-for sales in the UK. The song was written by Henderson, Louis Schoorl, Marco Daniel Borrero and Natalie Dunn.

Background
Talking about the song, Henderson said, "Writing 'Glorious' was a mind-cleansing moment for me. It represents the first time I truly began to start celebrating everything I used to live in fear of. Learning to accept and love yourself for who you are can be difficult in this day and age. ‘Glorious’ stands for everything we should feel about ourselves – empowered and proud."

Charts

Release history

References

External links

2019 songs
Ella Henderson songs
Asylum Records singles
Atlantic Records singles
Songs written by Ella Henderson
Songs written by Louis Schoorl
Songs written by Nat Dunn